This is a list of mayors of Cambridge, Ontario. The mayor presides over Cambridge, Ontario City Council.

Mayors
Claudette Millar — 1973-1974
Robert Kerr — 1974-1976
Erwin Nelson — 1976-1978
Claudette Millar — 1978-1988
Jane Brewer — 1988-2000
Doug Craig — 2000-2018
Kathryn McGarry — 2018-2022
Jan Liggett — 2022-present

References

External links
City of Cambridge Council History

Cambridge